Francis Chouat (born 20 December 1948) is a French historian and politician of La République En Marche! (LREM) who served as a member of the National Assembly after winning a by-election in 2018, representing Essonne's 1st constituency.

Chouat did not run for re-election in the 2022 French legislative election.

Political career 
Chouat joined the Socialist Party (PS) in 1995. From 1999 to 2002, he worked as economic policy advisor to the President of the Regional Council of Île-de-France, Jean-Paul Huchon. In 2012, he was elected mayor of Évry, succeeding Manuel Valls. Ahead of the 2017 Senate elections, he left the PS.

In parliament, Chouat served on the Committee on Cultural Affairs and Education (2018–2019) and the Finance Committee (since 2019).

In February 2020, Chouat joined the newly established Territoires de progrès movement launched by Jean-Yves Le Drian and Olivier Dussopt. By May 2020, he also joined En commun (EC), a group within LREM led by Barbara Pompili.

Political positions 
In July 2019, Chouat voted in favor of the French ratification of the European Union’s Comprehensive Economic and Trade Agreement (CETA) with Canada.

Personal life 
Chouat's brother Didier Chouat was also an MP.

References 

1948 births
Living people
Deputies of the 15th National Assembly of the French Fifth Republic
La République En Marche! politicians
21st-century French politicians
Mayors of places in Île-de-France
People from Argenteuil
Members of Parliament for Essonne